Thomas Grady (1835–1891) was an Irish recipient of the Victoria Cross.

Thomas Grady may also refer to:
Thomas Joseph Grady (1914–2002), American prelate of the Roman Catholic Church
Tom Grady (born 1958), member of the Florida House of Representatives
Thomas Eugene Grady (1880–1974), Justice of the Washington Supreme Court
Thomas F. Grady (1853–1912), New York politician
Thomas Grady (politician) (born 1939), member of the Nevada Assembly
Tommy Grady (Thomas Grady), arena football quarterback
Tom Grady, a character in the film The Final Storm